The Good Soldier is a 1915 novel by Ford Madox Ford.

The Good Soldier may also refer to:

Film and television 
The Good Soldier (1981 film), a 1981 television film adapted from the novel
The Good Soldier (2009 film), a 2009 documentary film by Lexy Lovell and Michael Uys
 "The Good Soldier" (Homeland), an episode of Homeland
 "The Good Soldier" (Grimm), an episode of Grimm
 "Good Soldier", a second season episode of Burn Notice
 "The Good Soldier", an episode of The Musketeers

Music 
 "The Good Soldier", a song by Nine Inch Nails from Year Zero
 "Good Soldier", a song by Flobots from Survival Story

Other 
The Good Soldiers, a fictitious play in the 1994 Doctor Who New Adventures novel Theatre of War by Justin Richards

See also 
 The Good Soldier Švejk (disambiguation)